Lewis MacLeod may refer to:

Lewis MacLeod (actor) (born 1970), Scottish actor
Lewis Macleod (footballer) (born 1994), Scottish footballer
Lewis MacLeod (rugby union) (1885–1907), Scottish rugby union player